Patrick J. Duffy (28 July 1875 – 21 July 1946) was an Irish Cumann na nGaedheal politician. He was first elected to Dáil Éireann as a Cumann na nGaedheal Teachta Dála (TD) for the Monaghan constituency at the 1923 general election. He lost his seat at the June 1927 general election. 

Duffy was born in Doohamlet, near Castleblayney in County Monaghan. He was an active member of the Irish Volunteers and took part in the Irish War of Independence.  He was married to Sarah Lawless of Ringsend, Dublin and they had 8 children.

References

1875 births
1946 deaths
Cumann na nGaedheal TDs
Members of the 4th Dáil
Politicians from County Monaghan